The women's tournament of the 2012 World Senior Curling Championships was held from April 14 to 21.

Teams
The teams are listed as follows:

Yellow Group

Rose Group

Round robin standings
Final Round Robin Standings

Round robin results
All times listed in Central Europe Time (UTC+1).

Yellow Group

Sunday, April 15
Draw 3
16:00

Monday, April 16
Draw 6
12:30

Draw 8
19:30

Tuesday, April 17
Draw 11
16:00

Wednesday, April 18
Draw 14
12:30

Draw 15
16:00

Thursday, April 19
Draw 18
12:30

Draw 20
19:30

Rose Group

Sunday, April 15
Draw 2
12:30

Draw 4
19:30

Monday, April 16
Draw 7
16:00

Tuesday, April 17
Draw 10
12:30

Draw 12
19:30

Wednesday, April 18
Draw 16
19:30

Thursday, April 19
Draw 19
16:00

Tiebreaker
Friday, April 20, 9:00

Playoffs

Semifinals
Saturday, April 21, 9:00

Bronze medal game
Saturday, April 21, 14:00

Gold medal game
Saturday, April 21, 14:00

References

External links

Results from CupOnline

World Senior Curling Championships
2012 in curling
International curling competitions hosted by Denmark
2012 in Danish women's sport
2012 in women's curling